Eyvind W. Wang (born 8 December 1942) is a Norwegian politician for the Conservative Party.

Wang is from Blommenholm in Bærum and started his career as a car mechanic. He became a workshop manager at Skotvedt and later served on its board of directors. He was also a chairman of Vestfjorden Avløpsselskap.

Wang was first elected to Asker municipal council in 1975 and served as mayor of Asker municipality from 1980 to 1995. In 1979 he defeated fellow party member Jens Wisløff for reelection. He was succeeded by Morten Strand from the same party. He served as a deputy representative to the Norwegian Parliament from Akershus from 1993 to 1997. He has also chaired the Conservative Party county chapter in Akershus and has been a member of the central party committee.

References

1942 births
Living people
Deputy members of the Storting
Conservative Party (Norway) politicians
Mayors of places in Akershus
Asker politicians
Norwegian businesspeople